Ultimate tensile strength (also called UTS, tensile strength, TS, ultimate strength or ) within equations is the maximum stress that a material can withstand while being stretched or pulled before breaking. In brittle materials the ultimate tensile strength is close to the yield point, whereas in ductile materials the ultimate tensile strength can be higher.

The ultimate tensile strength is usually found by performing a tensile test and recording the engineering stress versus strain. The highest point of the stress–strain curve is the ultimate tensile strength and has units of stress. The equivalent point for the case of compression, instead of tension, is called the compressive strength.

Tensile strengths are rarely of any consequence in the design of ductile members, but they are important with brittle members. They are tabulated for common materials such as alloys, composite materials, ceramics, plastics, and wood.

Definition 
The ultimate tensile strength of a material is an intensive property; therefore its value does not depend on the size of the test specimen. However, depending on the material, it may be dependent on other factors, such as the preparation of the specimen, the presence or otherwise of surface defects, and the temperature of the test environment and material.

Some materials break very sharply, without plastic deformation, in what is called a brittle failure.  Others, which are more ductile, including most metals, experience some plastic deformation and possibly necking before fracture.

Tensile strength is defined as a stress, which is measured as force per unit area. For some non-homogeneous materials (or for assembled components) it can be reported just as a force or as a force per unit width. In the International System of Units (SI), the unit is the pascal (Pa) (or a multiple thereof, often megapascals (MPa), using the SI prefix mega); or, equivalently to pascals, newtons per square metre (N/m2). A United States customary unit is pounds per square inch (lb/in2 or psi). Kilopounds per square inch (ksi, or sometimes kpsi) is equal to 1000 psi, and is commonly used in the United States, when measuring tensile strengths.

Ductile materials

Many materials can display linear elastic behavior, defined by a linear stress–strain relationship, as shown in figure 1 up to point 3. The elastic behavior of materials often extends into a non-linear region, represented in figure 1 by point 2 (the "yield point"), up to which deformations are completely recoverable upon removal of the load; that is, a specimen loaded elastically in tension will elongate, but will return to its original shape and size when unloaded. Beyond this elastic region, for ductile materials, such as steel, deformations are plastic. A plastically deformed specimen does not completely return to its original size and shape when unloaded. For many applications, plastic deformation is unacceptable, and is used as the design limitation.

After the yield point, ductile metals undergo a period of strain hardening, in which the stress increases again with increasing strain, and they begin to neck, as the cross-sectional area of the specimen decreases due to plastic flow. In a sufficiently ductile material, when necking becomes substantial, it causes a reversal of the engineering stress–strain curve (curve A, figure 2); this is because the engineering stress is calculated assuming the original cross-sectional area before necking. The reversal point is the maximum stress on the engineering stress–strain curve, and the engineering stress coordinate of this point is the ultimate tensile strength, given by point 1.

Ultimate tensile strength is not used in the design of ductile static members because design practices dictate the use of the yield stress. It is, however, used for quality control, because of the ease of testing. It is also used to roughly determine material types for unknown samples.

The ultimate tensile strength is a common engineering parameter to design members made of brittle material because such materials have no yield point.

Testing

Typically, the testing involves taking a small sample with a fixed cross-sectional area, and then pulling it with a tensometer at a constant strain (change in gauge length divided by initial gauge length) rate until the sample breaks.

When testing some metals, indentation hardness correlates linearly with tensile strength. This important relation permits economically important nondestructive testing of bulk metal deliveries with lightweight, even portable equipment, such as hand-held Rockwell hardness testers. This practical correlation helps quality assurance in metalworking industries to extend well beyond the laboratory and universal testing machines.

Typical tensile strengths

Many of the values depend on manufacturing process and purity or composition.
Multiwalled carbon nanotubes have the highest tensile strength of any material yet measured, with one measurement of 63 GPa, still well below one theoretical value of 300 GPa. The first nanotube ropes (20 mm in length) whose tensile strength was published (in 2000) had a strength of 3.6 GPa. The density depends on the manufacturing method, and the lowest value is 0.037 or 0.55 (solid).
The strength of spider silk is highly variable. It depends on many factors including kind of silk (Every spider can produce several for sundry purposes.), species, age of silk, temperature, humidity, swiftness at which stress is applied during testing, length stress is applied, and way the silk is gathered (forced silking or natural spinning). The value shown in the table, 1000 MPa, is roughly representative of the results from a few studies involving several different species of spider however specific results varied greatly.
Human hair strength varies by ethnicity and chemical treatments.

Typical Properties of annealed elements

See also
Flexural strength
Strength of materials
Tensile structure
Toughness
Failure
Tension (physics)
Young's modulus

References

Further reading
Giancoli, Douglas, Physics for Scientists & Engineers Third Edition (2000). Upper Saddle River: Prentice Hall.

T Follett, Life without metals

George E. Dieter, Mechanical Metallurgy (1988). McGraw-Hill, UK

Materials science
Elasticity (physics)